Grand Sable Lake is an undeveloped lake in Michigan's Upper Peninsula near the town of Grand Marais, Michigan. It lies within the boundaries of the Pictured Rocks National Lakeshore.

County Highway H-58 runs along the northwestern shore of the lake and provides access to the Grand Sable Dunes which overlook the lake. Additionally, there is a sandy beach and picnic area available to visitors. There is a concrete boat access site on the eastern shore of the lake.

The soils around Grand Sable Lake are very sandy and the shoreline is mostly wooded

See also
List of lakes in Michigan

References 

Pictured Rocks National Lakeshore
Lakes of Michigan
Lakes of Alger County, Michigan